The 1989 English cricket season was the 90th in which the County Championship had been an official competition. Australia re-emerged as a world-class team having struggled for most of the previous 12 years. Under the leadership of Allan Border, a very fine team had been forged that included Steve Waugh, Mark Taylor, Ian Healy, David Boon and Merv Hughes. They regained the Ashes by defeating England 4-0. Worcestershire won the County Championship.

Honours
County Championship - Worcestershire
NatWest Trophy - Warwickshire
Sunday League - Lancashire
Benson & Hedges Cup - Nottinghamshire
Minor Counties Championship - Oxfordshire
MCCA Knockout Trophy - Cumberland
Second XI Championship - Middlesex II 
Wisden - Jimmy Cook, Dean Jones, Jack Russell, Robin Smith, Mark Taylor

Test series

County Championship

NatWest Trophy

Benson & Hedges Cup

Sunday League

Leading batsmen

Leading bowlers

References

External sources
 CricketArchive – season and tournament itineraries

Annual reviews
 Playfair Cricket Annual 1990
 Wisden Cricketers' Almanack 1990

English cricket seasons in the 20th century
English Cricket Season, 1989
Cricket season